Antoinette D. Sanford  is a Guamanian businesswoman and politician. Sanford is a former Democratic senator in the Guam Legislature.

Early life 
Sanford was born in Guam. Sanford's father was Juan Lujan Pangelinan (1922-2009). Sanford's mother is Dolores Haniu Untalan. Sanford has three brothers and three sisters. In 1968, Sanford graduated from Academy of Our Lady of Guam, an all-girls Catholic high school.

Education 
In 1972, Sanford earned a Bachelor of Arts degree in Business Management with minors in Accounting and Psychology from University of Guam. In 2008, Sanford earned an MBA degree in Accounting and Finance from American InterContinental University.

Career 
As a businesswoman, Sanford is the president and co-founder of Sanford Technology Group, LLC (STG) (formerly A-D Sandford & Co), a computer services business.

In September 2013, Sanford became a founding member of Guam Women's Chamber of Commerce.

On November 5, 2002, Sanford won the election and became a Democratic senator in the Guam Legislature. Sanford began her term on January 6, 2003, in the 27th Guam Legislature.

In 2018, Sanford was elected as Chairperson of University of Guam Board of Regents.

Awards 
 1993 Guam Business News Executive of the Year.
 2014 Guam Business Magazine Businesswoman of the Year Lifetime Achievement Award. Presented at the ninth annual Businesswoman of the Year Maga’haga award program. Sponsored by First Hawaiian Bank and Guam Business Magazine. April 26, 2014.

Personal life 
Sanford's full name is Antoinette (Tony) Untalan Pangelinan Sanford. Sanford's husband is Dave Sanford. They have three sons.

References

External links 
 Toni Sanford at ourcampaigns.com
 Executives throughout the years: A look at the past Executives of the Year at guambusinessmagazine.com
 WOMEN IN PUBLIC SERVICE

Guamanian businesspeople
Guamanian Democrats
Guamanian women in politics
Living people
Members of the Legislature of Guam
University of Guam alumni
Year of birth missing (living people)
21st-century American women